Suryapet district is a district in the Indian state of Telangana. The city of Suryapet is the district headquarters. The district has three revenue divisions Suryapet, Kodad and Huzurnagar. It is sub-divided into 23 mandals. The district shares boundaries with Nalgonda, Khammam, Yadadri, Jangaon and Mahabubabad districts and with Andhra Pradesh state.

Geography 

This district is bounded by Jangaon district, Mahabubabad district in the northeast, Khammam district in the east, Andhra Pradesh in the south, Nalgonda district in the west and Yadadri Bhuvanagiri in the northwest.

Demographics 

 Census of India, the district has a population of 1,099,560. According to the 2011 census, 83.28% of the population speaks Telugu, 11.24% Lambadi and 4.97% Urdu as their first language.

The Krishna River and Musi River flow through the Suryapet district.

Major city 
Suryapet

Major towns 
Kodad
Huzurnagar
Neredcherla
Thirumalagiri
Thungathurthy

Villages 
 

Madhavarayunigudem

Culture and Tourism 
Lingamanthula Swamy temple - 5 km from Suryapet
Sri Parvathi Mahadeva Nameshwara Temple and Chennakeshava Swamy temple, Pillalamarri - 6 km from Suryapet
Dandu Maisamma temple - 12 km from Suryapet
Sri Undrugonda Lakshmi Narasimha Swamy temple, Undrugonda - 13 km from Suryapet
Musi Reservoir - 27 km from Suryapet
Phanigiri Buddhist Site - 42 km from Suryapet
Ananthagiri Hill - 54 km from Suryapet
Janapadu Dargah-55 km from Suryapet
Swayambu Shambhu Lingeshwara Temple, Mellacheruvu - 63 km from Suryapet
Mattapalli Sri Lakshmi Narasimha Swamy Temple, Mattapalli - 80 km from Suryapet

Administrative divisions 
The district has three revenue divisions of Suryapet, Kodad and Huzurnagar revenue division. It is sub-divided into 23 mandals. Amoy kumar is the present collector of the district..The district consists of five municipalities. Suryapet, Kodad, Huzurnagar, Thirumalagiri and Neredcherla are the five municipalities.

Mandals

Notable personalities 
Tollywood actors Kanta Rao, Prabhakar Reddy, Venu Madhav were from Suryapet District.

B. Santosh Babu, Army colonel and Maha Vir Chakra awardee killed during Galwan Valley clash

See also 
 Jan Pahad Dargah
 List of districts in Telangana

References

External links

 Official website
Suryapet district

 
Districts of Telangana
2016 establishments in Telangana